Life's a Riot with Spy vs Spy is Billy Bragg's first album, released in 1983. All songs on the original album consisted of Bragg singing to his electric guitar accompaniment.

The original album played at 45 rpm rather than the more usual 33⅓ rpm, contained only seven songs and lasted for only 15 minutes and 57 seconds. However, rather than being classified as an EP, it qualified for the UK Albums Chart and reached number 30 in January 1984.

The album contains both politically charged songs, such as the attack on the school system and unemployment, "To Have and to Have Not", and love songs such as "The Milkman of Human Kindness" and "A New England" (which was later a hit for singer Kirsty MacColl).

Reception

It was ranked at number 3 among the "Albums of the Year" for 1983 by NME; thirty years later, the magazine ranked it at number 440 in its list of "The 500 Greatest Albums of All Time".

Versions
The album was originally released by Utility Records through Chrysalis in May 1983. The cassette version of the album was recorded on only one side of the tape; the second side of the tape was blank, inscribed with a message that fans should use it to bootleg his concerts. The album was then reissued in November 1983 on Go! Discs. In 1986 the tracks from the album along with the tracks from Brewing Up with Billy Bragg (1984) and the tracks from the Between the Wars EP (1985) were issued on a compilation album called Back to Basics by Go! Discs. This compilation was reissued by Cooking Vinyl in 1996. Cooking Vinyl released another compilation album in 1996 combining the tracks from the album with the four tracks from the Between the Wars EP and titled Life's a Riot Between the Wars.

In 2006 as part of a series of reissues of albums from his back catalogue, the album was reissued as Life's a Riot with Spy vs Spy, with the original tracks on one disc along with a bonus CD of alternative versions and previously unreleased material. The tracks on the bonus CD were produced and compiled by Grant Showbiz.

In October 2013, to celebrate the 30th anniversary of the original release, a new version was released. This featured a remastered version of the original tracks alongside a live performance of the album which was recorded live at the Union Chapel, London on 5 June 2013.

Track listing
All songs written by Billy Bragg, except where noted

"The Milkman of Human Kindness" – 2:49
"To Have and to Have Not" – 2:33
"Richard" – 2:51
"A New England" – 2:14
"The Man in the Iron Mask" – 2:13
"The Busy Girl Buys Beauty" – 1:58
"Lovers Town Revisited" – 1:19

Additional tracks on 2006 reissue
"Strange Things Happen" (alternative version) – 3:19
"The Cloth I" – 2:50
"Love Lives Here" – 1:42
"Speedway Hero" – 2:39
"Loving You Too Long" – 2:51
"The Guitar Says Sorry" (alternative version) – 2:14
"Love Gets Dangerous" (alternative version) – 2:32
"The Cloth II" – 2:47
"The Man in the Iron Mask" (alternative version) – 2:17
"A13, Trunk Road to the Sea" (music by Bobby Troup, words by Bragg) – 2:27
"Fear Is a Man's Best Friend" (John Cale) – 2:32

Additional tracks (live) on 2013 reissue
"Intro"
"Lovers Town Revisited"
"To Have and to Have Not"
"The Busy Girl Buys Beauty"
"The Man in the Iron Mask"
"Richard"
"The Milkman of Human Kindness"
"A New England"

Personnel

Musicians
Billy Bragg – vocals, guitar
Dave Woodhead – trumpet on "The Man in the Iron Mask" (alternative version)

Production
Oliver Hitch – producer, engineer, recorded by (original album plus "The Guitar Says Sorry" (alternative version), "Love Gets Dangerous" (alternative version), "The Cloth II", "A13, Trunk Road to the Sea", "Fear Is a Man's Best Friend")
Grant Showbiz – reissue producer, reissue compiled by
Tim Young – digitally remastered by (original album tracks)
Duncan Cowell – digitally remastered by (bonus tracks)
Steve Goldstein – recorded by ("Strange Things Happen" (alternative version), "The Cloth I", "Love Lives Here")
Wiggy – recorded by ("Speedway Hero", "Loving You too Long")

Footnotes

References
Official Billy Bragg discography
2006 reissue CD liner notes

Billy Bragg albums
1983 debut albums
Cooking Vinyl albums